Graphic texture is commonly created by exsolution and devitrification and immiscibility processes in igneous rocks.
It is called 'graphic' because the exsolved or devitrified minerals form  lines and shapes which are reminiscent of writing.

Graphic granite is a leucocratic granitic rock consisting of alkali feldspar with exsolved quartz typically forming a distinctive repetitive pattern sometimes resembling cuneiform writing. Experiments have shown that graphic granite texture is derived from large single crystals of quartz and feldspar interleaving to create the cuneiform illusion.

Exsolved magnetite has graphic texture, as do some exsolution textures of pyroxene, pyrite feldspar and rarely other minerals.

See also
 List of rock textures
 Rock microstructure#Graphic and other intergrowth textures
 Peperite

References

External links
Gallery of graphic granites

Igneous rocks